Graha Pena is a skyscraper building in Surabaya. It is one of the tallest buildings and is located at the south part of Surabaya. It has a height of 175 m. It is the headquarters of Jawa Pos, the most popular newspaper group in Indonesia.

See also
List of tallest buildings in Surabaya

References

External links
 

Buildings and structures in Surabaya
Skyscraper office buildings in Indonesia